Three on a Meathook is a 1972 horror film written and directed by William Girdler and starring Charles Kissinger, James Pickett and Sherry Steiner. The film is loosely based on the crimes committed by Ed Gein.

Plot
When four girls go on a weekend trip to a lake, they start to have car problems on the way home and meet a local young man named Billy Townsend, who takes them back to his farm where he lives with his father Frank. Later, Frank begins to murder three of the girls and tries to pin the crimes on his son by convincing him he is responsible for their deaths and is insane.

Production
Three on a Meathook was director William Girdler's second film that was a take on a story influenced by Ed Gein. The film crew included the Asman brothers, with John Asman on sound, William Asman behind the camera and film editor Henry Asman. The film received funding from a local realtor named Joe Schulten, as well as cash from Girdler's trust fund.

See also
 List of American films of 1972

References

Footnotes

Sources

External links
 
 

1972 films
1972 horror films
1972 independent films
1970s slasher films
American independent films
Films directed by William Girdler
Crime films based on actual events
American serial killer films
American slasher films
1970s English-language films
1970s American films